Nathan Zézé (born 18 June 2005) is a French professional footballer who plays as a centre-back for Nantes.

Early life 
Having grown up in La Varenne, just North-East of the Nantes Metropolis, Nathan Zézé joined the Nantes Academy as an under-9.

Club career 
Growing trough the youth ranks of the team from Brittany, Zézé came to captain its under-17 and under-19 sides, despite being the youngest on the pitch when he first captained the latter in 2021. During the 2021–22 season he helped the under-19s to a national title, qualifying them for the European Youth League.

At the start of the 2022–23 season, Zézé moved to the reserve National 2 team, whilst also playing the UEFA Youth League.

He replaced an injured Nicolas Pallois before half-time, as his team had just scored its first goal, Zézé helping them to keep a clean-sheet for the rest of the game.

International career 
Zézé is a youth international for France, having played with France under-17s until 2021, before being selected with the under-18 for the Tournoi de Limoges the following year.

Style of play 
A left-footed centre-back, Zézé is described as a tall and strong defender with good placement and anticipation, able to frequently win aerial duels and score headers, while also having many ball-playing qualities, confortable with both short and long passes.

References

External links

2005 births
Living people
Footballers from Nantes
French footballers
France youth international footballers
French sportspeople of Ivorian descent
Association football defenders
FC Nantes players
Championnat National 2 players